Ichbiah is a surname. It is the 3,581,007th most common family name in the world, carried  by around 1 in 251,280,501 persons. It is most common in Europe. 

Notable people with the surname include:

Daniel Ichbiah, French author
Jean Ichbiah (1940–2007), French computer scientist

References